Mugineic acid is the organic compound consisting of a azetidine group and three carboxylates.  A colorless solid, it is a siderophore. More specifically, it is a phytosiderophore, i.e. a plant-produced siderophore. It functions as an iron accumulating agent for barley and other plants.  Related phytosiderophores include nicotianamine and avenic acid.

It is biosynthesized from S-methylmethionine.  The compound binds metal ions as a hexadentate ligand.

References

Siderophores
Secondary amino acids
Tricarboxylic acids
Azetidines
Hexadentate ligands